Mail is a Japanese horror manga series written and illustrated by Housui Yamazaki. The English translation is published by Dark Horse Comics.

He uses a broomhandle pistol called  and hallowed ammunition to shoot ghosts that may or may not have possessed people and seal them inside the bullets which simply drop to the floor. The bullets are later ritually cleansed at a shrine. The pistol also has the ability to revive the dead by shooting a bullet with a ghost sealed inside into its original body. Akiba does this at the beginning of the third and final volume with the ghost of his childhood friend  and she becomes his sidekick.

The series is organized into short self-contained chapters with no overarching plot, though some chapters explore Akiba's backstory. However, most are simple cases that Akiba solves, usually with an introduction by Akiba talking to the reader at the beginning of the chapter.

A Japanese live-action movie adaption has been created from the series. In the movie version Takamasa Suga plays the role of Akiba while Mikoto is played by Chiaki Kuriyama.

List of chapters

References

External links
 Dark Horse official site
 

2004 films
2004 manga
Dark Horse Comics titles
Horror anime and manga
Live-action films based on manga
Japanese horror films
Kadokawa Shoten manga
Kadokawa Dwango franchises
Shōnen manga
2000s Japanese films